Abhaya Hiranmayi is an Indian playback singer. She has recorded songs and provided backing vocals for film music in Malayalam and Telugu languages.

Early life and education

Born in a creatively inclined family in Thiruvananthapuram, Kerala. Hiranmayi did not take up any formal training in music until later. She learnt the basics of music from her mother Lathika, a postgraduate in music and a disciple of Prof. Neyyattinkara M.K. Mohanachandran and gained further knowledge by passively listening to musical lessons conducted by her father's brother, a professor at Swati Thirunal College of Music. Her father G. Mohan, was a programme producer for Doordarshan Kendra.

Hiranmayi grew up in Thiruvananthapuram where she attended Carmel School. She studied engineering in Muslim Association College of Engineering Venjaramoodu Thiruvananthapuram before dropping out to pursue a career in music.

Abhaya was in a live-in relationship with composer Gopi Sundar, and in July 2018, Sundar revealed that they had been together for 9 years. In May 2022, Gopi Sundar declared their break up by confirming his relationship with the singer Amrutha Suresh.

Career
Hiranmayi started off her career in 2014 providing backing vocals for Malayalam film songs. She made her debut through the song Naku Penta, Naku Taka from the eponymous film, providing backup vocals in a Swahili dialect. It was followed by Thanne Thanne from Dileep-Mamta Mohandas starrer Two Countries whose music composer, Gopi Sundar used her voice as an interlude to the song. The same year, she crooned the song Choti Zindagi for the Telugu film Malli Malli Idi Rani Roju. In 2016, she lent her vocals for the romantic ballad Mazhaye Mazhaye along with Karthik for the film James & Alice followed by Sathya directed by late Diphan and in the following year, Koyikode Song, an ode to Kozhikode and its rustic music, composed by her longtime collaborator, Gopi Sundar for the Malayalam film Goodalochana became an instant hit post its release and got her first award at Asiavision Awards for Excellence in Singing.

Discography

Television
 Tharathinoppam as Host
 Parayam Nedam as Participant

Acting role
2022 : Lalitham Sundaram as Reality show judge

References

External links
 

Year of birth missing (living people)
Living people
Indian women playback singers
21st-century Indian singers
Indian women pop singers
Malayalam playback singers
Telugu playback singers
Singers from Thiruvananthapuram
Indian women folk singers
Indian folk singers
21st-century Indian women singers
Women musicians from Kerala
Film musicians from Kerala
Indian folk-pop singers
Actresses in Malayalam cinema